Charles Kerr may refer to:

People 
Charles Edward Kerr (1890–1976), American jazz drummer
 Charles Kerr, 2nd Earl of Ancram (1624–1690), styled Lord Kerr or Carr until 1654 when he inherited the earldom
 Charles H. Kerr (1860–1944), founder of Charles H Kerr Company Publishers
 Charles H. M. Kerr (1858–1907), British artist and illustrator
 Charles Kerr, 1st Baron Teviot (1874–1968), British National Liberal Member of Parliament 1932–1940, ennobled 1940
 Charles John Kerr, 2nd Baron Teviot (born 1940), son of 1st Baron Teviot
 Charles Kerr (actor) in Married to It
 Charles Kerr (curler), see Tim Hortons Brier
 Charles Kerr (horseman) in Washington Park Handicap
 Charles Kerr (orator), see Errol Solomon Meyers Memorial Lecture
 Charles Kerr (screenwriter) (1892–1954), American assistant film director and screenwriter
 Charles William Kerr (1875–1951), Moderator of the General Assembly for the Presbyterian Church
 Charles Lester Kerr (1886–1965), British naval officer and submarine commander

Companies 
 Charles H. Kerr Publishing Company, established in 1886, Chicago-based publisher of socialist and anarchist works

See also 
 Charles Carr (disambiguation), variant spelling 
Charles Ker (disambiguation)

Kerr, Charles